Nick Boddie Williams (1906–1992), known as Nick B. Williams, was the editor of the Los Angeles Times from 1958 to 1971.  He was also a science-fiction writer.

Williams was born in Onancock, Virginia, and studied at the University of Texas, where he earned a degree in government in 1929. He worked for the Fort Worth Star-Telegram, The Tennessean in Nashville and the Los Angeles Express before joining the Times in 1931 as a copy editor.

He died at the age of 85 on July 1, 1992, in South Laguna, California. He was survived by his wife, Barbara; three daughters, Susan Williams, Elliot Davis and Elizabeth Agajanian; and a son, Nick Van Boddie Williams Jr.

References

1906 births
1992 deaths
20th-century American novelists
American male journalists
20th-century American journalists
American male novelists
American science fiction writers
American male short story writers
20th-century American short story writers
20th-century American male writers
People from Onancock, Virginia
20th-century American non-fiction writers